Theodore William Chaundy (19 January 1889 – 14 April 1966) was an English mathematician who introduced Burchnall–Chaundy theory.

Chaundy was born to widowed businessman John Chaundy and his second wife Sarah Pates in their shop-cum-home at 49 Broad Street in Oxford. John had eight children, one of whom died as a toddler, with his late first wife and died barely a year after Chaundy was born. The Chaundy home along Broad Street has since been demolished.

Chaundy attended Oxford High School for Boys and read mathematics at Balliol College, Oxford on a scholarship. In 1912 he became a lecturer at Oxford and later named a Fellow of Christ Church, Oxford. He married Hilda Weston Dott (1890–1986) in 1920. They had five children and thirteen grandchildren.

Publications

References
Sources

  Papers of Theodore William Chaundy at the National Archives

Notes

1889 births
1966 deaths
Alumni of Balliol College, Oxford
English mathematicians
Fellows of Christ Church, Oxford
People from Oxford